István Sugár (1942 − ) is a Hungarian former ice dancer. With Ilona Berecz, he is a two-time Hungarian national champion and the 1968 Blue Swords bronze medalist. They finished in the top ten at three European Championships.

Career 
Sugár teamed up with Ilona Berecz around 1963. The duo finished in the top ten at the 1969 European Championships in Garmisch-Partenkirchen, West Germany; 1970 European Championships in Leningrad, Soviet Union; and 1971 European Championships in Zürich, Switzerland. They competed at three World Championships; their best result, 12th, came in 1970 (Ljubljana, Yugoslavia). They won two Hungarian national titles.

Sugár served as an ice dancing judge at the 1984 Winter Olympics in Sarajevo, Yugoslavia; 1988 Winter Olympics in Calgary, Alberta, Canada; 1992 Winter Olympics in Albertville, France; and at other competitions into the following century. He has also worked as an ISU referee for ice dancing.

Competitive highlights 
With Berecz

References 

1942 births
Figure skating judges
Hungarian male ice dancers
Living people